Ilija Bozoljac and Igor Zelenay were the defending champions but only Zelenay chose to defend his title, partnering Denys Molchanov. Zelenay lost in the quarterfinals to Ken and Neal Skupski.

Skupski and Skupski won the title after defeating Purav Raja and Divij Sharan 4–6, 6–3, [10–5] in the final.

Seeds

Draw

References

 Main Draw

Slovak Open - Men's Doubles
2016 Doubles